Woodcote Park is a stately home near Epsom, Surrey, England, currently owned by the Royal Automobile Club. It was formerly the seat of a number of prominent English families, including the Calvert family, Barons Baltimore and Lords Proprietor of the colony of Maryland. The interior of the house once boasted a gilded library and number of fine murals by notable Italian artists including Antonio Verrio, but most of the historic rooms were removed by the RAC, which had purchased the house in 1913, and what remained was destroyed by fire in 1934. The present appearance of the house dates from its restoration in 1936. However, one of the original drawing rooms, noted for its excellent carved wood panelling and other decorations in the style of Thomas Chippendale, still survives in the Museum of Fine Arts at Boston, Massachusetts.

Seventeenth century
The present house was built in 1679 by Richard Evelyn, brother to John Evelyn the diarist, and is mentioned in the diary of Samuel Pepys. The Evelyns left Woodcote to Charles Calvert, 3rd Baron Baltimore, proprietary governor of the colony of Maryland. Lord Baltimore, a Roman Catholic, lost control of the province of Maryland during the "Protestant Revolution" of 1689.

Eighteenth century
In around 1712, Woodcote was described by Celia Fiennes:
"Lord Baltimores in Woodcut Green encompassed with a wall at the entrance, a breast wall with pallisadoes, large courts one within the other, and a back way to the stables where there is a pretty horse pond; the house is old but low, though large run over much ground; as I drove by the side saw broad chimneys on the end and at due distance on the side on both ends the sides of a court which terminated in a building on which there is a lead with railes and barristers."

In 1715 the Third Lord Baltimore died, and Woodcote Park was inherited by Benedict Calvert, 4th Baron Baltimore. However he died less than two months after his father, on 16 April 1715.

On Benedict's death Woodcote was inherited by the fifteen-year-old Charles Calvert, 5th Baron Baltimore, born in 1699. Calvert made many changes to the house, including adding a Palladian facade by John Vardy, though Lord Baltimore's brothers complained that he "pulled down everything" and "finished nothing".

On Charles's death in 1751, his son, Frederick Calvert, 6th Baron Baltimore, inherited the estate. According to Horace Walpole, Frederick spent large sums of money making the interior of the house 'tawdry' and 'ridiculous' in the 'French' style.

Despite his enormous wealth, Frederick Calvert eventually found himself in financial difficulties, and, following his acquittal for rape at Kingston Assizes in 1768, he sold Woodcote Park, apparently to a wealthy Soho upholsterer.

Nineteenth century

In 1812 the house was described in the following terms:
"The mansion is situated in a vale, at the foot of a well wooded eminence, which rises rather abruptly to the south. The east or entrance front is represented in the view given, as seen from the opposite eminence. The basement is cased with stone, and the remainder of the building is stuccoed. It consists of a centre with wings extending in a curvilinear form, and presents an extensive and very imposing frontage. A flight of steps, with balustrade, conducts to the hall which is of good dimensions, and is adorned with coupled Corinthian columns supporting a frieze. Amongst the principal apartments, of which five are en-suite, are two withdrawing-rooms; the walls of the smaller were decorated and painted, as also the ceiling, by foreign artists. The library is a very splendid room, being ornamented with a profusion of gilding on a blue ground. On the ceiling is painted Ganymede, by Verrio. An apartment, styled the painted room, has its walls covered with designs illustrative of the Greek romance of Daphnis and Chloe. At the west end of the building an apartment, formerly used as a chapel, has a painted ceiling representing the Resurrection, by Verrio. On the first floor is a room 40 feet by 28, and 18 feet high. The park lies about a mile south of the village of Epsom, and contiguous to the race-course; it contains about 350 acres."

Twentieth century
In 1913 the house was purchased by the Royal Automobile Club, which had been seeking a country club with the potential for a golf course for its members. Most of the fine interiors commissioned by the Calverts were then removed by the RAC; the club instructed one Harold G. Lancaster of 55 Conduit St to remove the historic rooms and sell them at auction.

During the First World War, Woodcote Park was taken over for a military training camp, nicknamed "Tin City", which accommodated over 5,500 men. It was also the location of the largest convalescent hospital, built by the 21st Battalion of the Royal Fusiliers, with over 3,800 beds. The first patients were Australian and New Zealand troops from Gallipoli, later followed by Canadian troops from the Battle of the Somme. 

In 1927 one of the mansion's drawing rooms, noted for its excellent carved wood panelling and other decorations in the style of Thomas Chippendale (possibly originally designed for Charles Calvert, 5th Baron Baltimore), was shipped to the United States and installed in the Museum of Fine Arts at Boston, Massachusetts.

Fire and restoration
In 1934 the house was gutted by fire.  Major restoration efforts were soon undertaken, and by May 1936 it had been largely reconstructed.  Fortunately the outer pavilions of the house and many agricultural buildings remained intact, as well as the entrance steps, balustrades and colonnades.  The façade of the house was restored as close to the original as was possible.

Second World War

During the Second World War, Woodcote Park was again taken over for military use, being pressed into service as a training centre. The ornamental gardens were ploughed up to grow food for the war effort. In the summer of 1940, during the height of the Battle of Britain, a Hawker Hurricane fighter aircraft was forced to land on the golf course of Woodcote Park. The pilot received medical assistance in the RAC clubhouse, having first proved that he was not an enemy airman by waving a packet of Players cigarettes at nearby golfers.

Woodcote Park today
Today Woodcote Park serves as one of two club houses of the RAC; the other being in London at 89–91 Pall Mall. It is a grade II* listed building.

See also
 Baron Baltimore

Notes

References
 Hayton, David, p.443, The House of Commons 1690–1715, Volume 2 Retrieved October 2010
 Harris, John, Moving Rooms Retrieved October 2010
 
 Yentsch, Anne E, A Chesapeake Family and their Slaves: a Study in Historical Archaeology, Cambridge University Press (1994) Retrieved September 2010

External links
 Epsom and Ewell History Explorer Retrieved August 31, 2010
 RAC official website Retrieved August 31, 2010

Country houses in Surrey
Calvert family residences
Epsom and Ewell
Grade II* listed buildings in Surrey